George Stagg may refer to:

 George Stagg (died 1966), former policeman who murdered English footballer Tommy Ball
 George T. Stagg, a limited-production bourbon whiskey distributed by Buffalo Trace Distillery